Benderloch is a village in Argyll and Bute, Scotland. The name is derived from Beinn eadar dà loch, meaning "mountain between two lochs".

Benderloch lies on the A828 road  in the coastal parish of Ardchattan, Argyll, Scotland. 
It grew up as the railway line from Ballachullish to Connel was completed in the early part of the 1900s, between the older locations of Selma and Craigneuk. 
Its railway station closed in 1966.
Benderloch has a village shop (the renowned "Pink Shop"), garage, caravan and leisure store, cafe and a forest walk up to a viewpoint on the summit of Beinn Lora. 
Benderloch forms part of the Lynn of Lorn National Scenic Area, one of forty in Scotland.

References

External links

Village website

Villages in Argyll and Bute